Yao Lijun ( born on 2 October 1981 in Haining, Zhejiang) is a former Chinese football player who played the majority of his career as a defender for Shanghai Shenhua.

Club career
Yao Lijun began his football career playing for Shanghai 02 where his impressive displays for the club would see him captain the team to numerous youth championships, before joining their senior team that took part in the third tier in the 2000 Chinese league season. After playing in one league season with the club they were taken over by top tier side Shanghai Shenhua and he moved towards their senior team. After making his debut in 2002 he was a squad regular for Shanghai Shenhua where he could play as either right-back or centre-back, however due to his versatility he consistently had other players preferred to when fighting for competition of places, however despite that he was part of the team that went on to win the 2003 Chinese Jia-A League title. Unfortunately in 2013 the Chinese Football Association would revoke the league title after it was discovered the Shenhua General manager Lou Shifang had bribed officials to be bias to Shenhua in games that season. By the beginning of the 2007 league season Shenhua had merged with local rivals Shanghai United F.C. and with the exceptionally large squad Yao would gradually gain even less playing time until in 2010 he was dropped to the reserve team.

Honours
Shanghai Shenhua
Chinese Jia-A League: 2003 (revoked due to match-fixing scandal)

References

External links
Player Profile at Shanghai Shenhua
Player Profile at Football-lineups website
Player Profile at sportscn.com

1981 births
Living people
Sportspeople from Jiaxing
Chinese footballers
Footballers from Zhejiang
Shanghai Shenhua F.C. players
Association football defenders